is a train station in the town of Mihama, Chita District, Aichi Prefecture, Japan, operated by Meitetsu.

Lines

Station layout

The station has two opposed side platforms. The platforms are short, and can handle trains of only six carriages or less. The station has automated ticket machines, Manaca automated turnstiles and is unattended..

Platforms

Adjacent stations

Station history
Kōwaguchi Station was opened on July 1, 1932 as a station on the Chita Railway. The Chita Railway became part of the Meitetsu group on February 2, 1943.  In 2007, the Tranpass system of magnetic fare cards with automatic turnstiles was implemented.

Passenger statistics
In fiscal 2018, the station was used by an average of 306 passengers daily.

Surrounding area
Kawawaguchi Shioshiri Hunting Ground

See also
 List of Railway Stations in Japan

References

External links

 Official web page 

Railway stations in Japan opened in 1932
Railway stations in Aichi Prefecture
Stations of Nagoya Railroad
Mihama, Aichi